Pachyphytum oviferum, the sugaralmond plant or moonstone, is a species of plant in the genus Pachyphytum.

The meaning of the name Pachyphytum oviferum is thick plant bearing eggs.

It comes from Mexico, in the rocky cliffs of the state of San Luis Potosi at 1200 meters altitude.

Description

The leaves are succulent and egg-shaped, which gave its name to the species.

The stems (20 cm long, 1 cm thick) rise then fall with about 15 leaves. These leaves are 3 to 5 cm long, 1.8 to 3 cm wide and 8 to 17 mm thick.

Leaves are pale blue-green to bluish-purple, looking like a sugared almond confection. 

The inflorescence consists of a 30 cm stem bearing scarlet, bell-shaped flowers.

References

Bibliography

External links

Crassulaceae